The  is a Japanese maglev line under construction between Tokyo and  Nagoya, with plans for extension to Osaka. Its initial section is between Shinagawa Station in Tokyo and Nagoya Station in Nagoya, with stations in Sagamihara, Kōfu, Iida and Nakatsugawa. About 90% of the  line to Nagoya will be tunnels.

The Chuo Shinkansen is the culmination of Japanese maglev development since the 1970s, a government-funded project initiated by Japan Airlines and the former Japanese National Railways (JNR). Central Japan Railway Company (JR Central) now operates the facilities and research. The line is intended to be built by extending and incorporating the existing Yamanashi test track (see below).

Government permission to proceed with construction was granted on 27 May 2011. Construction of the line, which is expected to cost over ¥9 trillion, commenced in 2014. 
The start date of commercial service is currently unknown, after Shizuoka Prefecture denied permission for construction work on a portion of the route in June 2020. JR Central originally aimed to begin commercial service between Tokyo and Nagoya in 2027, with the Nagoya–Osaka section planned to be completed as early as 2037.
Originally, the Nagoya-Osaka section was planned to be completed as late as 2045, but the date was moved up following a loan from the Japanese government.

Development overview

Miyazaki and Yamanashi Test Tracks

Following the opening of the Tokaido Shinkansen between Tokyo and Osaka  in 1964, Japanese National Railways (JNR) focused on the development of faster Maglev technology. In the 1970s, a  test track for Maglev research and development was built in Miyazaki Prefecture. As desired results had been obtained at the (now former) Miyazaki test track, an 18.4 kilometer test track with tunnels, bridges and slopes was built at a site in Yamanashi Prefecture, between Ōtsuki and Tsuru. Residents of Yamanashi Prefecture and government officials were eligible for free rides on the Yamanashi test track, and over 200,000 people took part. Trains on this test track have routinely achieved operating speeds of over 500 km/h (310 mph), making this an embryonic part of the future Chuo Shinkansen.

Extension and upgrading work was completed by June 2013, allowing researchers to test sustained top speed over longer periods.
The first tests covering this longer track took place in August 2013.
JR Central began offering public train rides at 500 km/h on the Yamanashi test track, via a lottery selection, in 2014.
This event was repeated in August 2022. The train has the world record for fastest manned train on this track.

Routing
The line's route passes through many sparsely populated areas in the Japanese Alps (Akaishi Mountains), but is more direct than the current Tōkaidō Shinkansen route, and time saved through a more direct route was a more important criterion to JR Central than having stations at intermediate population centers. Also, the more heavily populated Tōkaidō route is congested, and providing an alternative route if the Tōkaidō Shinkansen were to become blocked by earthquake damage was also a consideration. This is significantly more than the traditional Shinkansen lines, which top out at 3%.

The planned route between Nagoya and Osaka includes a stop in Nara. In 2012, politicians and business leaders in Kyoto petitioned the central government and JR Central to change the route to pass through their city. The governor of Nara Prefecture announced in November 2013 that he had re-confirmed the Transport Ministry's intention to route the segment through Nara.

JR Central announced in July 2008 that the Chūō Shinkansen would start at Tokyo's Shinagawa Station, citing difficulties in securing land at nearby Tokyo and Shinjuku stations for a maglev terminal.

A JR Central report on the Chuo Shinkansen was approved by a Liberal Democratic Party panel in October 2008, which certified three proposed routes for the Maglev. According to a Japan Times news article, JR Central supported the more direct route, which would cost less money to build than the other two proposals, backed by Nagano Prefecture. The latter two plans had the line swinging up north between Kōfu and Nakatsugawa stations to serve areas within Nagano. In June 2009, JR Central also announced research results comparing the three routes, estimating revenue and travel time, which showed the most favorable being the shortest Plan C, with long tunnels under the Japanese Alps. The Council for Transport Policy for the Ministry of Land, Infrastructure, Transport and Tourism concluded on 20 October 2010 that Plan C would be most cost-efficient. JR Central announced that one station would be constructed in each of Yamanashi, Gifu, Nagano, and Kanagawa Prefectures.  
On 31 October 2014, Japan's Ministry of Land, Infrastructure, Transport and Tourism approved Plan C for construction. Construction began on 17 December 2014.

Preparatory work at Nagoya station began in 2016. 
The structure is named 名古屋駅新ビル ("Nagoya-eki Shin-biru", Nagoya Station new building) and accommodates a station for the maglev trains in its basement area.

Construction schedule and costs

JR Central announced in December 2007 that it planned to raise funds for the construction of the Chuo Shinkansen on its own, without government financing. Total cost, originally estimated at 5.1 trillion yen in 2007, escalated to over 9 trillion yen by 2011. Nevertheless, the company has said it can make a pre-tax profit of around 70 billion yen in 2026, when the operating costs stabilize.

The original construction schedule from 2013, which called for the Tokyo–Nagoya segment to open in 2027 and the Nagoya–Osaka segment to open in 2045, was designed to keep JR Central's total debt burden below its approximate level at the time of privatization (around 5 trillion yen). The schedule was later altered to bring forward the completion date of the Nagoya-Osaka segment to 2037, after JR Central received a loan from the Japanese government.

The first major contract announced was for a  tunnel in Yamanashi and Shizuoka prefectures expected to be completed in 2025. Construction has also started on the maglev station at Shinagawa. Being built below the existing Shinkansen station, and to consist of two platforms and four tracks, construction is planned to take 10 years, largely to avoid disruption to the existing Tokaido Shinkansen services located above the new station.

JR Central estimates that Chuo Shinkansen fares will be only slightly more expensive than Tokaido Shinkansen fares, with a difference of around 700 yen between Tokyo and Nagoya, and around 1,000 yen between Tokyo and Osaka. The positive economic impact of the Chuo Shinkansen in reducing travel times between the cities has been estimated at anywhere between 5 and 17 trillion yen during the line's first fifty years of operation.

The Ōi River issue 

Construction is yet to commence on the part of the line going through Shizuoka Prefecture, as the municipality has expressed concern about water from the Ōi River leaking into the tunnel, lowering the water level. JR Central has expressed concern early on that the delay on construction of the only 9 kilometer long section going through Shizuoka might throw the entire project off schedule.

Officials of Shizuoka Prefecture, in a meeting with JR Central in June 2020, denied permission to begin construction work on the tunnel. JR Central announced the following week that it would be "difficult" to open the Tokyo-Nagoya line in 2027 as previously announced.

The incumbent governor of Shizuoka Prefecture Heita Kawakatsu was re-elected in June 2021. His platform was partially built on continued opposition to construction of the new line barring further accommodations by JR Central.

Following a series of meetings between JR Central and Shizuoka Prefecture facilitated by the Ministry of Transportation, an interim report was released on the results of the meetings so far in late December 2021. Among other things, the report confirmed that while JR was committed to returning any water leaking into the tunnel once construction was completed, there is no known feasible way to return all of the water during the construction phase. However, it did also conclude that the amount of water leaked was likely to be insignificant.

On 7 January 2022, commenting on the report, the Shizuoka Prefecture governor expressed continued opposition to construction when it could result in water levels going down, even if only during construction. He urged JR Central to re-investigate the possibility of returning leaking water during construction. On 20 January that same year, the prefecture officially called the report "insufficient", and announced that it still would not allow construction to commence.

Osaka Extension 
The government of Osaka Prefecture, as well as local corporations such as Suntory and Nippon Life, have raised concerns about the impact of the delayed construction of the Nagoya–Osaka segment on the Osaka economy. Politicians from the Kansai region called for, and received, state-backed loans for JR Central in order to expedite the line's construction, resulting in the opening of the extension being moved forward by up to 8 years.

Accidents 
The construction of the Chuo Shinkansen involves a large amount of tunneling through seismically active terrain. As such, unexpected collapses and water leaks are relatively common. This section only lists accidents which seriously injured or killed people.

On 27 October 2021, two construction workers died when part of the retaining wall of a temporary work tunnel collapsed. JR Central concluded that the safety checks carried out were insufficient, and vowed to make it clearer to workers which areas had and had not completed the safety checks necessary to allow for the presence of human workers going forward.

Route

 
The line will run between Tokyo and Nagoya, with plans for extension to Osaka. Its initial section is between Shinagawa Station in Tokyo and Nagoya Station in Nagoya, with stations in Sagamihara, Kōfu, Iida, and Nakatsugawa. 
The line has one station for each prefecture it passes through, except for Shizuoka.

Technology

The Chūō Shinkansen will employ the SCMaglev technology, a maglev (magnetic levitation train) system developed by JR Central. The levitating force is generated between superconducting magnets on the trains and coils on the track.
The absence of wheel friction allows normal operation at over 500 km/h, and higher accelerations and deceleration performance compared to conventional high-speed rail.

Magnetic coils are used both for levitation and propulsion. Trains are accelerated by alternating currents on the ground producing attraction and repulsion forces with the coils on the train. The levitation and guidance system, working with the same principle, ensures that the train is elevated and centered in the track.

Energy consumption
In 2018, a scientific comparison of the energy consumption of SCMaglev, Transrapid and conventional high-speed trains was conducted. The energy consumption per square meter of usable area was examined according to speed. The results show that there are only minor differences at speeds of 200 km/h and above. However, maglevs can reach much higher speeds than trains. Conventional trains, on the other hand, require less energy at slow speeds, with this advantage either reversing slightly, or at least shrinking significantly, in favor of maglevs during high-speed operation. However, as the Chūō Shinkansen mostly runs in tunnels, air resistance will be much higher than for most high-speed railways, driving up energy consumption significantly.

During normal operating conditions, the energy consumption of the L0 series between Tokyo and Osaka is estimated at 90-100 Wh/seat-km. For comparison, the conventional N700-series train operating on the fastest service-pattern on the existing line between Tokyo and Osaka has an estimated energy consumption of 70 Wh/seat-km.

Despite this increase, the L0 series still consumes much less energy than even the most efficient short/medium-haul modern passenger aircraft. For instance, the Airbus A319neo uses ~209 Wh/seat-km over a distance of 1,900 km. This figure would presumably be even higher for very short flights such as Tokyo-Nagoya, with much less time spent cruising.
Moreover, the operation of the L0 series maglev train is completely electric, making it easier to transition to renewable energy sources.

Rolling stock

On 26 March 2020, the Improved L0 Series started operations on the test track. It represents the completion of 80–90% of the design goals for the final train, and is the first to draw power from the track. Previous models used on-board gas generators.

See also

 Transrapid
 Aérotrain
 High-speed rail
 Shinkansen
 List of railway test tracks

References

External links
JR Central information about the Chuo Shinkansen
JR Central's website for the Linear-Express service 
Linear Chuo Express 
SCMAGLEV Website
SCMaglev at International Maglev Board 

High-speed railway lines in Japan
Shinkansen
Proposed railway lines in Japan
Railway test tracks
2027 in rail transport